Anay Tejeda Quesada (born 3 April 1983 in Marianao, Havana) is a Cuban hurdler. Her personal best time is 12.61 seconds, achieved in July 2008 in Cali.

Personal bests

Achievements

External links

Tilastopaja biography
Ecured biography (in Spanish)

1983 births
Living people
Athletes from Havana
Cuban female hurdlers
Athletes (track and field) at the 2004 Summer Olympics
Athletes (track and field) at the 2008 Summer Olympics
Athletes (track and field) at the 2003 Pan American Games
Athletes (track and field) at the 2007 Pan American Games
Olympic athletes of Cuba
Pan American Games medalists in athletics (track and field)
Pan American Games bronze medalists for Cuba
World Athletics Championships athletes for Cuba
Central American and Caribbean Games gold medalists for Cuba
Competitors at the 2006 Central American and Caribbean Games
Central American and Caribbean Games medalists in athletics
Medalists at the 2007 Pan American Games
21st-century Cuban women